Victor IV (born Octavian or Octavianus: Ottaviano dei Crescenzi Ottaviani di Monticelli) (1095 – 20 April 1164) was elected as a Ghibelline antipope in 1159, following the death of Pope Adrian IV and the election of Alexander III. His election was supported by the Emperor Frederick Barbarossa. He took the name Victor IV, not accounting for Antipope Victor IV of 1138, whose holding of the papal office was deemed illegitimate.

Early life and career
Octaviano Monticelli belonged to one of the most powerful counts of Tusculum. He was appointed as rector of Benevento in May 1137, and cardinal priest of San Nicola in Carcere in 1138. In 1151 Octaviano became cardinal priest of Santa Cecilia. He was described by John of Salisbury as eloquent and refined, but petty and parsimonious. When he was sent with Cardinal Jordan of Santa Susanna as a papal legate to summon Conrad III of Germany to Italy to be crowned Holy Roman Emperor, he quarrelled with his co-legate and, in John of Salisbury's words, "made the Church a laughingstock". In Germany, he met Frederick, duke of Swabia, who would soon become the new Emperor Frederick Barbarossa; the cardinal was present at the imperial election.

Reign as pope

Election
Following the death of Pope Adrian IV, the College of Cardinals gathered to elect a new pope. During the Papal election of 4–7 September 1159 they elected the chancellor Rolando, who assumed the title of Alexander III. However, five cardinals, the clergy of St. Peter's, and the Roman populace refused to recognize him and elected their own candidate Octaviano on 7 September 1159. He was very popular on account of his liberality, accessibility, and splendour of living. He was considered a great friend of the Germans and rested his hopes on the Emperor Frederick Barbarossa. Yet it is not to be assumed that the emperor, busy with the Siege of Crema, had desired his election; Rolando was certainly not agreeable to him, yet neither was it to his interest to have an antipope.

Consecration
Victor IV was consecrated on 4 October in the abbey of Farfa by Cardinal-Bishop Imar of Tusculum, dean of the Sacred College of Cardinals, assisted by Ubaldo, bishop of Ferentino and Riccardo, bishop of Melfi. With the armed assistance of Otto von Wittelsbach and his own armed groups in relatively short time he took control over the City of Rome and the Patrimony of St. Peter, while Alexander III took refuge in the territory of the Kingdom of Sicily, and later in France.

Synod at Pavia
Both popes sent their legates to the Catholic kingdoms in order to secure their recognition. As a matter of fact, the emperor was at first neutral and called upon the bishops not to take sides; the decision, the emperor said, should be reserved for the action of the Church. Being the chief protector of the Church, Victor convoked a synod at Pavia in February 1160. The emperor,  after the sacking of Crema the previous month, demanded that Alexander appear before the emperor at Pavia and accept the imperial decree. Alexander III declined, arguing that the pope should be subjected only to the judgment of God.  Emperor Frederick I then declared himself in favour of Victor IV, and the synod decided, as was to be expected, for Victor, and pronounced an anathema upon Alexander. On February 11, 1160, the council ended with a procession to Pavia Cathedral. Here Victor was received by the emperor, who, as a sign of humility, helped him to get off the horse and took him by the hand and led him to the altar and kissed his feet. Most of the episcopate of the Empire followed the decision of the synod. However, this attempt to secure Victor's recognition was never completely successful in Germany, since Bishop Eberhard of Salzburg was his principal opponent. In response, Alexander on his side excommunicated both Frederick I and Victor IV.

Recognition
King Valdemar I of Denmark also gave his support to Victor IV, but the primate of Denmark archbishop Eskil of Lund became a partisan of Alexander III. It seems that Poland also supported Victor IV. Alexander was nevertheless able to gain the support of the rest of western Europe, because since the days of Hildebrand the power of the pope over the church in the various countries had increased so greatly that the kings of France and of England could not view with indifference a revival of such imperial control of the papacy as had been exercised by the Emperor Henry III. Therefore, France, England, Castile, Sweden, Norway, Scotland, Hungary, Sicily, and the Crusader states in Outremer recognized Alexander III as true pope, even if in some of these countries there were significant Victorine minorities in episcopates or among feudal rulers.  The papal schism in Europe was now a fact.

In 1162, King Louis VII of France wavered once more. Frederick then attempted to convoke a joint council at Saint-Jean-de-Losne with Louis VII to decide the issue of who should be the pope. Louis neared the meeting site, but when he became aware that Frederick had stacked the votes for Alexander, Louis decided not to attend the council. As a result, the issue was not resolved at that time. This disastrous meeting had as its result that the king held firmly to the obedience of Alexander. During the years 1162–1165 Alexander lived in France, and from 1163 the pope exerted himself to gain more of Germany for his cause.

Death
All uncertainty came to an end on 20 April 1164. That day, while travelling with Rainald of Dassel, Victor IV died at Lucca. When Pope Alexander III learned of the death of his rival, he wept, and reprimanded his cardinals when they showed inappropriate delight. The clergy of the Lucca Cathedral and San Frediano would not allow Victor IV buried there because of his excommunication. Therefore, he was buried in a local monastery. When miracles were reported at his tomb, it was destroyed by order of Pope Gregory VIII in December 1187. Victor's successor was Paschal III.

See also
 Papal selection before 1059
 Papal conclave (since 1274)

Notes

Sources
Barlow, F. (1936). "The English, Norman and French Councils called to deal with Papal Schism in 1159," English Historical Review 51 (1936), pp. 242–268.
 

 

Löffler, Klemens, in: 
Meyer, Moritz (1871). Die Wahl Alexander III und Victor IV (1159): Ein Beitrag zur Geschichte der Kirchenspaltung unter Kaiser Friedrich I (Göttingen 1871) (in German). 

Reardon, Wendy J. 2004. The Deaths of the Popes. Macfarland & Company, Inc.

External links
 Crescenzi family

Date of birth unknown
1095 births
Victor 4 2
People from Tivoli, Lazio
12th-century antipopes
12th-century Italian cardinals
People excommunicated by the Catholic Church